The Swiss Life Arena is an ice hockey and entertainment arena in Altstetten, Zurich, Switzerland. It is located approximately 7 kilometers west of Downtown Zurich. The arena officially opened in October 2022.

The arena currently serves as the home for the ZSC Lions of the National League (NL) and seats up to 12,000 spectators for hockey games.

Background
Starting in the 2022/2023 season, the Swiss Life Arena will be the new arena of the ZSC Lions’ national league A-team, which will play as many as 40 national and international matches there every year. The arena will also host games of GCK/ZSC Lions young talent.

The Swiss Life Arena is planned as a multifunctional event space and is to enjoy modern infrastructure. With its steeply graded seating and compact construction, the arena will be a “cauldron”, with a focus on sports and corporate events.

Swiss Life, a Swiss provider of pension and financial solutions, will lend its name to the arena. The former Swisslife Arena in Lucerne has been operating under the name "Eiszentrum Luzern" since 2014. The name sponsorship with Swiss Life expired at the end of 2012.

Funding
The estimated cost for the Swiss Life Arena is about CHF 169 million. The funding is as follows : CHF 30 million from equity, CHF 19 million from third parties and the remaining CHF 120 million come as a loan from the city of Zurich. The ZSC Lions will also receive, along with operating income, an urban operating contribution of CHF 2 million per year. Profits will mostly be used for amortization and strengthening of equity.

Opening
The Lions played their inaugural game at Swiss Life Arena during the regular season against HC Fribourg-Gottéron on October 18, 2022. They won the game 2–1 in a sellout arena.

Events
The venue will host matches for the 2028 European Men's Handball Championship.

See also
 List of indoor arenas in Switzerland

References

External links

Indoor arenas in Switzerland
Indoor ice hockey venues in Switzerland
Buildings and structures in Lucerne
Swiss Life
Sports venues completed in 2022
2022 establishments in Switzerland
21st-century architecture in Switzerland